Orchard Central is a shopping mall in Singapore located along the main shopping belt at Orchard Road. It sits on the land previously occupied by an open air carpark and has a 160m frontage along Orchard Road. It was officially opened on 2 July 2009. In December 2016, Forbes recognized Orchard Central as one of the top five shopping malls in Singapore.

Architecture
Orchard Central was designed by DP Architects. It is designed as Singapore's first vertical mall, and it consists of 12 floors above ground and 2 basement levels. Unlike traditional mall designs, a central atrium is omitted and It also features a "super escalator", which takes pedestrians on the street level directly up to Level 4. The mall is served by a total of 52 escalators (including 6 super escalators) and 12 glass elevators.

The building has space for up to 400 stores, including flagship facilities for Uniqlo, the largest in Singapore, a 24 hours Don Don Donki store and Tokyu Hands. It also contains fourteen floors of space and numerous restaurants and cafes. The mall also contains a terminal for tourist buses, a tourist information center, currency exchanges and duty exemption services catering to tourists.

The mall features a 140m shopping street discovery walk and a green roof which are both open 24 hours to the public. Designed by Japanese design house Super Potato, the green roof features 3 large living walls and balcony rail on the 11th floor and 2 lower green walls on the 12th-floor roof terrace. There is also a biological pond located on the 12th storey of the green roof.

Other features of the mall includes open sided galleries and multiple atriums. The mall is connected to 313@Somerset and Orchard Gateway.

Art Trail
Orchard Central has artworks that are permanently displayed in clustered locations around the mall. The display is worth over SGD$9 million. Artworks featured in the display were curated by National Arts Council. The total development cost of the project is estimated to be more than SGD$650 million.

Artworks featured in this display were specially commissioned, and they were done by artists from countries such as the U.S., Japan, Australia and Denmark.

References

External links
 
 Photoset of Orchard Central on Flickr

Shopping malls in Singapore
Downtown Core (Singapore)
Orchard Road
Commercial buildings completed in 2009
2009 establishments in Singapore